Albert Ball,  (14 August 1896 – 7 May 1917) was a British fighter pilot during the First World War. At the time of his death he was the United Kingdom's leading flying ace, with 44 victories, and remained its fourth-highest scorer behind Edward Mannock, James McCudden, and George McElroy.

Born and raised in Nottingham, Ball joined the Sherwood Foresters at the outbreak of the First World War and was commissioned as a second lieutenant in October 1914. He transferred to the Royal Flying Corps (RFC) the following year, and gained his pilot's wings on 26 January 1916. Joining No. 13 Squadron RFC in France, he flew reconnaissance missions before being posted in May to No. 11 Squadron, a fighter unit. From then until his return to England on leave in October, he accrued many aerial victories, earning two Distinguished Service Orders and the Military Cross. He was the first ace to become a British national hero.

After a period on home establishment, Ball was posted to No. 56 Squadron, which deployed to the Western Front in April 1917. He crashed to his death in a field in France on 7 May, sparking a wave of national mourning and posthumous recognition, which included the award of the Victoria Cross for his actions during his final tour of duty. The famous German flying ace Manfred von Richthofen remarked upon hearing of Ball's death that he was "by far the best English flying man".

Early life and education 
Albert Ball was born on 14 August 1896 at a house on Lenton Boulevard in Lenton, Nottingham. After a series of moves throughout the area, his family settled at Sedgley in Lenton Road. His parents were Albert Ball, a successful businessman who rose from employment as a plumber to become Lord Mayor of Nottingham, and who was later knighted, and Harriett Mary Page. Albert had two siblings, a brother and a sister. His parents were considered loving and indulgent. In his youth, Ball had a small hut behind the family house where he tinkered with engines and electrical equipment. He was raised with a knowledge of firearms, and conducted target practice in Sedgleys gardens. Possessed of keen vision, he soon became a crack shot. He was also deeply religious. This did not curb his daring in such boyhood pursuits as steeplejacking; on his 16th birthday, he accompanied a local workman to the top of a tall factory chimney and strolled about unconcerned by the height.

Ball studied at the Lenton Church School, The King's School, Grantham and Nottingham High School before transferring to Trent College in January 1911, at the age of 14. As a student he displayed only average ability, but was able to develop his curiosity for things mechanical. His best subjects were carpentry, modelling, violin and photography.  He also served in the Officers' Training Corps. When Albert left school in December 1913, aged 17, his father helped him gain employment at Universal Engineering Works near the family home.

 First World War 

 Initial war service 
Following the outbreak of the First World War in August 1914, Ball enlisted in the British Army, joining the 2/7th (Robin Hood) Battalion of the Sherwood Foresters (Nottinghamshire and Derbyshire Regiment). Soon promoted to sergeant, he gained his commission as a second lieutenant on 29 October. He was assigned to training recruits, but this rear-echelon role annoyed him. In an attempt to see action, he transferred early the following year to the North Midlands Cyclist Company, Divisional Mounted Troops, but remained confined to a posting in England. On 24 February 1915, he wrote to his parents, "I have just sent five boys to France, and I hear that they will be in the firing line on Monday. It is just my luck to be unable to go."

In March 1915, Ball began a short-lived engagement to Dorothy (Dot) Elbourne. In June, he decided to take private flying lessons at Hendon Aerodrome, which would give him an outlet for his interest in engineering and possibly help him to see action in France sooner. He paid to undertake pilot training in his own time at the Ruffy-Baumann School, which charged £75 to £100 for instruction (£5,580 to £7,440 in 2010 prices).

Ball would wake at 3:00 am to ride his motorcycle to Ruffy-Baumann for flying practice at dawn, before beginning his daily military duty at 6:45 am. His training at Ruffy-Baumann was not unique; Edwin Cole was learning to fly there at the same time. In letters home Ball recorded that he found flying "great sport", and displayed what Peter de la Billière described as "almost brutal" detachment regarding accidents suffered by his fellow trainees:

 Military flight training and reconnaissance work 

Although considered an average pilot at best by his instructors, Ball qualified for his Royal Aero Club certificate (no. 1898) on 15 October 1915, and promptly requested transfer to the Royal Flying Corps (RFC). He was seconded to No. 9 (Reserve) Squadron RFC on 23 October, and trained at Mousehold Heath aerodrome near Norwich. In the first week of December, he soloed in a Maurice Farman Longhorn after standing duty all night, and his touchdown was rough. When his instructor commented sarcastically on the landing, Ball angrily exclaimed that he had only 15 minutes experience in the plane, and that if this was the best instruction he was going to get, he would rather return to his old unit. The instructor relented, and Ball then soloed again and landed successfully in five consecutive flights. His rough landing was not the last Ball was involved in; he survived two others. He completed his training at Central Flying School, Upavon, and was awarded his wings on 22 January 1916. A week later, he was officially transferred from the North Midlands Cyclist Company to the RFC as a pilot.

On 18 February 1916, Ball joined No. 13 Squadron RFC at Marieux in France, flying a two-seat Royal Aircraft Factory B.E.2c on reconnaissance missions. He survived being shot down by anti-aircraft fire on 27 March. Three days later, he fought the first of several combats in the B.E.2; he and his observer, Lieutenant S. A. Villiers, fired a drum and a half of Lewis gun ammunition at an enemy two-seater, but were driven off by a second one. After this inconclusive skirmish, Ball wrote home in one of his many letters, "I like this job, but nerves do not last long, and you soon want a rest". In letters home to his father, he discouraged the idea of his younger brother following him into the RFC. Ball and Villiers tried unsuccessfully to shoot down an enemy observation balloon in their two-seater on 10 April. Ball's burgeoning skills and aggressiveness gained him access to the squadron's single-seat Bristol Scout fighter later that month. April 1916 also saw Ball's first mention in a letter home of plans for "a most wonderful machine ... heaps better than the Hun Fokker". It is now generally believed that these "plans" were unconnected with the design of the Austin-Ball A.F.B.1, with which he later became involved.

 Initial fighter posting 
On 7 May 1916, Ball was posted to No. 11 Squadron, which operated a mix of fighters including Bristol Scouts, Nieuport 16s, and Royal Aircraft Factory F.E.2b "pushers". After his first day of flying with his new unit, he wrote a letter home complaining about fatigue. He was unhappy with the hygiene of his assigned billet in the nearest village, and elected to live in a tent on the flight line. Ball built a hut for himself to replace the tent and cultivated a garden.

Throughout his flying service Ball was primarily a "lone-wolf" pilot, stalking his prey from below until he drew close enough to use his top-wing Lewis gun on its Foster mounting, angled to fire upwards into the enemy's fuselage. According to fellow ace and Victoria Cross recipient James McCudden, "it was quite a work of art to pull this gun down and shoot upwards, and at the same time manage one's machine accurately". Ball was as much a loner on the ground as in the air, preferring to stay in his hut on the flight line away from other squadron members. His off-duty hours were spent tending his small garden and practising the violin. Though not unsociable per se, he was extremely sensitive and shy. Ball acted as his own mechanic on his aircraft and, as a consequence, was often untidy and dishevelled. His singularity in dress extended to his habit of flying without a helmet and goggles, and he wore his thick black hair longer than regulations generally permitted.

While flying a Bristol Scout on 16 May 1916, Ball scored his first aerial victory, driving down a German reconnaissance aircraft. He then switched to Nieuports, bringing down two LVGs on 29 May and a Fokker Eindecker on 1 June. On 25 June he became a balloon buster and an ace by destroying an observation balloon with phosphor bombs. During the month he had written to his parents admonishing them to try and "take it well" if he was killed, "for men tons better than I go in hundreds every day". He again achieved two victories in one sortie on 2 July, shooting down a Roland C.II and an Aviatik to bring his score to seven.

Ball then requested a few days off but, to his dismay, was temporarily reassigned to aerial reconnaissance duty with No. 8 Squadron, where he flew B.E.2s from 18 July until 14 August. During this posting, Ball undertook an unusual mission. On the evening of 28 July, he flew a French espionage agent across enemy lines. Dodging an attack by three German fighters, as well as anti-aircraft fire, he landed in a deserted field, only to find that the agent refused to get out of the aircraft. While he was on reconnaissance duties with No. 8 Squadron, the London Gazette announced that he had been awarded the Military Cross "for conspicuous skill and gallantry on many occasions," particularly for "one occasion [when] he attacked six in one flight". This was not unusual; throughout his career, Ball generally attacked on sight and heedless of the odds. He professed no hatred for his opponents, writing to his parents "I only scrap because it is my duty ... Nothing makes me feel more rotten than to see them go down, but you see it is either them or me, so I must do my duty best to make it a case of them".

Ball's 20th birthday was marked by his promotion to temporary captain and his return to No. 11 Squadron. He destroyed three Roland C.IIs in one sortie on 22 August 1916, the first RFC pilot to do so. He ended the day by fighting 14 Germans some  behind their lines. With his aircraft badly damaged and out of fuel, he struggled back to Allied lines to land. He transferred with part of No. 11 Squadron to No. 60 Squadron RFC on 23 August. His new commanding officer gave Ball a free rein to fly solo missions, and assigned him his own personal aircraft and maintenance crew. One of the squadron mechanics painted up a non-standard red propeller boss; A201 became the first of a series of Ball's aeroplanes to have such a colour scheme. He found that it helped his fellow squadron members identify his aircraft and confirm his combat claims. By end of the month, he had increased his tally to 17 enemy aircraft, including three on 28 August.

Ball then took leave in England. His feats in France had received considerable publicity. He was the first British ace to become a household name, and found that his celebrity was such that he could not walk down the streets of Nottingham without being stopped and congratulated. Prior to this the British government had suppressed the names of its aces—in contrast to the policy of the French and Germans—but the losses of the Battle of the Somme, which had commenced in July, made politic the publicising of its successes in the air. Ball's achievements had a profound impact on budding flyer Mick Mannock, who would become the United Kingdom's top-scoring ace and also receive the Victoria Cross.

Upon return to No. 60 Squadron in France, Ball scored morning and evening victories on 15 September, flying two different Nieuports. On the evening mission, he armed his aircraft with eight Le Prieur rockets, fitted to the outer struts and designed to fire electrically. He intended to use them on an observation balloon. As it happened, he spotted three German Roland C.IIs and broke their formation by salvoing his rockets at them, then picked off one of the pilots with machine-gun fire. After this he settled into an improved aeroplane, Nieuport 17 A213. He had it rigged to fly tail-heavy to facilitate his changing of ammunition drums in the machine-gun, and had a holster built into the cockpit for the Colt automatic pistol that he habitually carried. Three times during September he scored triple victories in a day, ending the month with his total score standing at 31, making him Britain's top-scoring ace. By this time he had told his commanding officer that he had to have a rest and that he was taking unnecessary risks because of his nerves. On 3 October, he was sent on leave, en route to a posting at the Home Establishment in England. A French semi-official report of Ball's successes was issued the same day; it was picked up and repeated in the British aviation journal Flight nine days later.

 Home front 
Ball had been awarded the Distinguished Service Order (DSO) and bar simultaneously on 26 September 1916. The first award was "for conspicuous gallantry and skill" when he took on two enemy formations. The bar was also "for conspicuous skill and gallantry" when he attacked four enemy aircraft in formation and then, on another occasion, 12 enemy machines. He was awarded the Russian Order of St. George the same month. Now that Ball had been posted back to England, he was lionised as a national hero with a reputation as a fearless pilot and expert marksman. A crowd of journalists awaited him on his family's doorstep. In an interview, he mentioned being downed six times in combat. On 18 November, he was invested with his Military Cross and both DSOs by King George V at Buckingham Palace. A second bar to the DSO, for taking on three enemy aircraft and shooting one down, followed on 25 November, making him the first three-time recipient of the award. Ball was promoted to the substantive rank of lieutenant on 8 December 1916.

Instead of returning to combat after his leave, Ball was posted to instructional duties with No. 34 (Reserve) Squadron RFC, based at Orford Ness, Suffolk. About this time he was debriefed by flying instructor Philip Gribble, who was charged with discovering the tactics of ace fighter pilots; Gribble decided Ball operated on "paramount courage and a bit of luck". Ball asked Gribble to let him try a Bristol Scout, which he landed badly, seriously damaging the undercarriage; Ball asked for another machine to try again, with the same result, after which he consoled himself by eating "seven pounds of chocolate". It was while serving on the home front that he was able to lobby for the building and testing of the Austin-Ball A.F.B.1 fighter. He hoped to be able to take an example of the type to France with him, but the prototype was not completed until after his death in action. In November he was invited to test fly the prototype of the new Royal Aircraft Factory S.E.5 single-seat scout, apparently the first service pilot to do so. He was unimpressed, finding the heavier, more stable fighter less responsive to the controls than the Nieuports he was used to. His negative assessment of other aspects of the S.E.'s performance, on the other hand, contrasted markedly with the reactions of fellow pilots who tested the prototype about this time. Ball was to maintain his opinion of the S.E. as a "dud", at least until he had scored several victories on the type after his return to France.

On 19 February 1917, in a tribute from his native city, Ball became an Honorary Freeman of Nottingham. Around this time he met James McCudden, also on leave, who later reported his impressions in most favourable terms. In London, Ball also encountered Canadian pilot Billy Bishop, who had not as yet seen combat. He immediately liked Bishop, and may have helped the latter secure a posting to No. 60 Squadron. On 25 March, while off-duty, Ball met 18-year-old Flora Young. He invited her to fly with him, and she accepted, wearing a leather flying coat that they had borrowed. On 5 April, they became engaged; she wore his silver identification wrist bracelet in lieu of an engagement ring.

 Second fighter posting 

Inaction chafed Ball, and he began agitating for a return to combat duty. He finally managed to obtain a posting as a flight commander with No. 56 Squadron RFC, considered to be as close to an elite unit as any established by the RFC. Ball was still first among Britain's aces, and some documents hint that his attachment to No. 56 Squadron was planned to be temporary. According to one account he had been slated to serve with the unit for only a month to mentor novice pilots.

The latest type from the Royal Aircraft Factory, the S.E.5, had been selected to equip the new squadron. This choice was viewed with some trepidation by the RFC high command, and Ball himself was personally far from happy with the S.E.5. After some intense lobbying he was allowed to retain his Nieuport 17 no. B1522 when the unit went to France; the Nieuport was for his solo missions, and he would fly an S.E.5 on patrols with the rest of the squadron. This arrangement had the personal approval of General Hugh Trenchard, who went on to become the first Chief of the Air Staff of the Royal Air Force. No. 56 Squadron moved to the Western Front on 7 April 1917. On arrival Ball wrote to his parents, "Cheero, am just about to start the great game again".

S.E.5 no. A4850, fresh from its packing crate, was extensively modified for Ball: in particular he had the synchronised Vickers machine gun removed, to be replaced with a second Lewis gun fitted to fire downwards through the floor of the cockpit. He also had a slightly larger fuel tank installed. On 9 April, A4850 was refitted, and the downward-firing Lewis gun removed and replaced by the normal Vickers gun mounting. In a letter to Flora Young on 18 April, Ball mentioned getting his own hut on the flight line, and installing the members of his flight nearby.

On 23 April 1917, Ball was under strict orders to stay over British lines, but still engaged the Germans five times in his Nieuport. In his first combat that day, using his preferred belly shot, he sent an Albatros into a spin, following it down and continuing to fire at it until it struck the ground. It was No. 56 Squadron's first victory. Ball coaxed the Nieuport home for repairs, returning to battle in an S.E.5. In his third combat of the day, he fired five rounds before his machine gun jammed. After landing to clear the gun, he took off once more, surprising five Albatros fighters and sending one down in flames. His fifth battle, shortly thereafter, appeared inconclusive, as the enemy plane managed to land safely. However, its observer had been mortally wounded.

Three days later, on 26 April, Ball scored another double victory, flying S.E.5 no. A4850, and one more on 28 April. This last day's fighting left the S.E.5 so battered by enemy action that it was dismantled and sent away for repair. The following month, despite continual problems with jamming guns in the S.E.5s, Ball shot down seven Albatroses in five days, including two reconnaissance models on 1 May, a reconnaissance plane and an Albatros D.III fighter on 2 May; a D.III on 4 May, and two D.IIIs the next day, 5 May. The second of these victims nearly rammed Ball as they shot it out in a head-on firing pass. As they sped past one another, Ball was left temporarily blinded by oil spraying from the holed oil tank of his craft. Clearing the oil from his eyes, he flew his S.E.5 home with zero oil pressure in an engine on the brink of seizure. He was so overwrought that it was some time after landing before he could finish thanking God, then dictating his combat report.

While squadron armourers and mechanics repaired the faulty machine-gun synchroniser on his most recent S.E.5 mount, A8898, Ball had been sporadically flying the Nieuport again, and was successful with it on 6  May, destroying one more Albatros D.III in an evening flight to raise his tally to 44. He had continued to undertake his habitual lone patrols, but had of late been fortunate to survive. The heavier battle damage that Ball's aircraft were now suffering bore witness to the improved team tactics being developed by his German opponents. Some time on 6 May, Ball had visited his friend Billy Bishop at the latter's aerodrome. He proposed that the pair attack the Red Baron's squadron at its airfield at dawn, catching the German pilots off guard. Bishop agreed to take part in the daring scheme at the end of the month, after he returned from his forthcoming leave. That night, in his last letter to his father, Ball wrote "I do get tired of always living to kill, and am really beginning to feel like a murderer. Shall be so pleased when I have finished".

 Final flight and aftermath 

On the evening of 7 May 1917, near Douai, 11 British aircraft from No. 56 Squadron led by Ball in an S.E.5 encountered German fighters from Jasta 11. A running dogfight in deteriorating visibility resulted, and the aircraft became scattered. Cecil Arthur Lewis, a participant in this fight, described it in his memoir Sagittarius Rising. Ball was last seen by fellow pilots pursuing the red Albatros D.III of the Red Baron's younger brother, Lothar von Richthofen, who eventually landed near Annœullin with a punctured fuel tank. Cyril Crowe observed Ball flying into a dark thundercloud.

Brothers Franz and Carl Hailer and the other two men in their party were from a German reconnaissance unit, Flieger-Abteilung A292. Franz Hailer noted, "It was leaving a cloud of black smoke... caused by oil leaking into the cylinders."  The engine had to be inverted for this to happen. The Hispano engine was known to flood its inlet manifold with fuel when upside down and then stop running. Franz Hailer and his three companions hurried to the crash site.  Ball was already dead when they arrived.  The four German airmen agreed that the crashed craft had suffered no battle damage.  No bullet wounds were found on Ball's body, even though Hailer went through Ball's clothing to find identification. Hailer also took Ball to a field hospital.Pengelly. Albert Ball VC: The Fighter Pilot Hero of World War I. pp. 196–97. A German doctor subsequently described a broken back and a crushed chest, along with fractured limbs, as the cause of death.

The Germans credited Richthofen with shooting down Ball, but there is some doubt as to what happened, especially as Richthofen's claim was for a Sopwith Triplane, not an S.E.5, which is a biplane. Given the amount of propaganda the German High Command generated touting the younger Richthofen, a high-level decision may have been taken to attribute Ball's death to him. It is probable that Ball was not shot down at all, but had become disoriented and lost control during his final combat, the victim of a form of temporary vertigo that has claimed other pilots.  Ball's squadron harboured hopes that he was a prisoner of war, and the British government officially listed him as "missing" on 18 May. There was much speculation in the press; in France, the Havas news agency reported: "Albert Ball, the star of aviators... has been missing since the 7th May. Is he a prisoner or has he been killed? If he is dead, he died fighting for his forty-fifth victory." It was only at the end of the month that the Germans dropped messages behind Allied lines announcing that Ball was dead, and had been buried in Annoeullin with full military honours two days after he crashed. Over the grave of the man they dubbed "the English Richthofen", the Germans erected a cross bearing the inscription Im Luftkampf gefallen für sein Vaterland Engl. Flieger-Hauptmann Albert Ball, Royal Flying Corps ("Fallen in air combat for his fatherland English pilot Captain Albert Ball").

Ball's death was reported worldwide in the press. He was lauded as the "wonder boy of the Flying Corps" in Britain's Weekly Dispatch, the "Ace of English Aces" in Portugal, the "heroe aviador" in South America, and the "super-airman" in France. On 7 June 1917, the London Gazette announced that he had received the Croix de Chevalier, Legion d'Honneur from the French government. The following day, he was awarded the Victoria Cross for his "most conspicuous and consistent bravery" in action from 25 April to 6 May 1917. On 10 June 1917, a memorial service was held for Ball in the centre of Nottingham at St Mary's Church, with large crowds paying tribute as the procession of mourners passed by. Among those attending were Ball's father Albert, Sr. and brother Cyril, now also a pilot in the RFC; his mother Harriett, overwhelmed with grief, was not present. Ball was posthumously promoted to captain on 15 June. His Victoria Cross was presented to his parents by King George V on 22 July 1917. The following year he was awarded a special medal by the Aero Club of America.

 Posthumous tributes 

In 1918, Walter A. Briscoe and H. Russell Stannard released a seminal biography, Captain Ball VC, reprinting many of Ball's letters and prefaced with encomiums by Prime Minister David Lloyd George, Field Marshal Sir Douglas Haig, and Major General Sir Hugh Trenchard. Lloyd George wrote that "What he says in one of his letters, 'I hate this game, but it is the only thing one must do just now', represents, I believe, the conviction of those vast armies who, realising what is at stake, have risked all and endured all that liberty may be saved". Haig spoke of Ball's "unrivalled courage" and his "example and incentive to those who have taken up his work".  In Trenchard's opinion, Ball had "a wonderfully well-balanced brain, and his loss to the Flying Corps was the greatest loss it could sustain at that time".

In the book proper, Briscoe and Stannard quote Ball's most notable opponent, Manfred von Richthofen. The Red Baron, who believed in his younger brother's victory award, considered Ball "by far the best English flying man". Elsewhere in the book, an unidentified Royal Flying Corps pilot who flew with Ball in his last engagement was quoted as saying, "I see they have given him the V.C. Of course he won it a dozen times over—the whole squadron knows that." The authors themselves described the story of Ball's life as that of "a young knight of gentle manner who learnt to fly and to kill at a time when all the world was killing... saddened by the great tragedy that had come into the world and made him a terrible instrument of Death".

Linda Raine Robertson, in The Dream of Civilised Warfare, noted that Briscoe and Stannard emphasised "the portrait of a boy of energy, pluck, and humility, a loner who placed his skill in the service of his nation, fought—indeed, invited—a personal war, and paid the ultimate sacrifice as a result", and that they "struggle to paste the mask of cheerful boyishness over the signs of the toll taken on him by the stress of air combat and the loss of friends".

Alan Clark, in Aces High: The War in the Air Over the Western Front, found Ball the "perfect public schoolboy" with "the enthusiasms and all the eager intelligence of that breed" and that these characteristics, coupled with a lack of worldly maturity, were "the ingredients of a perfect killer, where a smooth transition can be made between the motives that drive a boy to 'play hard' at school and then to 'fight hard' against the King's enemies". Biographer Chaz Bowyer considered that "to label Albert Ball a 'killer' would be to do him a grave injustice", as his "sensitive nature suffered in immediate retrospect whenever he succeeded in combat".

 Post-war legacy 

After the war the British discovered Ball's grave, which had been behind enemy lines, in the Annoeullin Cemetery. In December 1918, personnel of No. 207 Squadron RAF erected a new cross in place of the one left by the Germans. The Imperial War Graves Commission (now Commonwealth War Graves Commission) were working at the time to consolidate the British war graves into fewer cemeteries; 23 British bodies in graves in the location where Ball was buried were moved to the Cabaret Rouge British Cemetery, but at his father's request Ball's grave was allowed to remain. Albert Sr. paid for a private memorial to be erected over Ball's grave, No. 643, in what later became the Annoeullin Communal Cemetery and German Extension. Ball's is the only British grave from the First World War in this extension, the rest being German. Ball's father also bought the French field where his son had died and erected a memorial stone on the crash site.

Memorials to Ball in his native Nottingham include a monument and statue in the grounds of Nottingham Castle. The monument, which was commissioned by the city council and funded by public subscription, consists of a bronze group on a carved pedestal of Portland stone and granite. The bronze group, by the sculptor Henry Poole, shows a life-size figure of Ball with an allegorical female figure at his shoulder. The monument was unveiled on 8 September 1921 by Air Marshal Trenchard, with military honours including a flypast by a squadron of RAF aircraft. In 1929 the bronze model for Ball's statue was presented by his father to the National Portrait Gallery in London, where it is on display. In further remembrance of his son, Albert Ball, Sr. commissioned the building of the Albert Ball Memorial Homes in Lenton to house the families of local servicemen killed in action. The Lenton War Memorial, located in front of the homes, includes Ball's name and was also paid for by the Ball family. The homes were Grade-II listed for historic preservation in 1995.

A memorial to Ball, along with his parents, and a sister who died in infancy, appears on the exterior wall of the southwest corner of Holy Trinity Church in Lenton. Another memorial tablet is present inside the same church, mounted on the north wall and bearing the RFC and RAF motto Per Ardua ad Astra, along with decorations of medals and royal arms. In 1967, the Albert Ball VC Scholarships were instituted at his alma mater, Trent College. A propeller from one of Ball's aircraft and the original cross from his grave in France are displayed at the college's library and chapel, respectively. One of the houses at Nottingham High's Junior School is also named after Ball.

In 2006, Ball was one of six recipients of the Victoria Cross to be featured on a special commemorative edition of Royal Mail stamps marking the 150th anniversary of the award. In 2015, Ball was featured on a £5 coin (issued in silver and gold) in a six-coin set commemorating the Centenary of the First World War by the Royal Mint. His Victoria Cross is displayed at the Nottingham Castle Museum along with his other medals and memorabilia, including a bullet-holed Avro windshield, a section of engine piping from one of his damaged Nieuports, his Freedom of Nottingham Scroll and Casket, and various letters and other papers. A portrait study by Noel Denholm Davis is in the collection of Nottingham City Museums and Galleries.

 Award citations 

 Victoria Cross Distinguished Service Order (DSO) Distinguished Service Order (DSO) Bar Distinguished Service Order (DSO) Bar Military Cross (MC)'

List of victories 
Confirmed victories numbered; unconfirmed victories marked "u/c". Except where noted, data from Shores et al.

Notes

References

Further reading

External links 

 Film of the unveiling of Albert Ball's memorial at Nottingham Castle (British Pathé)
 French school children honour World War I Fighter Ace (Victoriacross.org.uk)
  Collège Albert Ball (school in Annœullin named after Ball in 1999)
 Catalogue record of letters from Albert Ball held at the Nottinghamshire Archives (The National Archives)
 Paintings of Albert Ball, JP, Captain Albert Ball, VC, and Lois Ball (BBC, originals at Nottingham Castle Museum and Art Gallery)
 Royal Flying Corps tunic worn by Albert Ball (Imperial War Museum)
 Procession for Albert Ball Memorial Service (Picture the Past)
 King George V presenting Ball's VC to his parents (Picture the Past)
 The Short But Eventful Life of Albert Ball, VC (Ed Dixon)

1896 births
1917 deaths
Aviators killed in aviation accidents or incidents in France
British Army personnel of World War I
British Army recipients of the Victoria Cross
Royal Flying Corps recipients of the Victoria Cross
British military personnel killed in World War I
British World War I flying aces
British World War I recipients of the Victoria Cross
Burials in Commonwealth War Graves Commission cemeteries in France
Chevaliers of the Légion d'honneur
Companions of the Distinguished Service Order
English aviators
People educated at Nottingham High School
People educated at The King's School, Grantham
People educated at Trent College
People from Lenton, Nottingham
Recipients of the Military Cross
Royal Flying Corps officers
Sherwood Foresters officers
Military personnel from Nottingham